Megatone may refer to:

Megatone Records
Megatone (Richard Wahnfried album), 1984
Megatone (Boris and Merzbow album), 2002

See also
Megaton (disambiguation)